Lubna Salim (née: Siddiqui) is an Indian theatre, movie and television actress. She is also the founder and producer for the theatre group Essay Ensemble.

Early life and education
She is the daughter of the popular script writer Javed Siddiqui. She studied at Mithibai College Mumbai, and pursued theatre at the inter-collegiate level.

Career
She won the Indian Telly Award in 2008 for her role in Baa Bahoo Aur Baby. In 2010, she acted in the play Lakeerein, written by Gulzar and directed by Salim Arif, opposite actor, Yashpal Sharma. She is now seen in the serial Khidki.

Personal life
She is married to theatre director Salim Arif.

Filmography

Films 
 Parbat Ke Us Paar (1988)
 Just Married (2007)
 OMG – Oh My God (2012)
 Call for Fun (2017) as Sheila Mehra
Photograph as Sheilaben

Television 
 Bharat Ek Khoj (1988)
 Baa Bahoo Aur Baby (2005-2009) in season 1 as Leela Thakkar
 Ek Packet Umeed (2008) as Paroma
 Mera Naam Karegi Roshan (2010) as Yashoda (Kuldeep's wife, main antagonist)
 2025 Jaane Kya Hoga Aage (2015) as Ganga Joshi
 Khidki (2016) as Jyoti Thakkar
 Rishton Ka Chakravyuh (2017-2018) as Madhu Pathak
 Mariam Khan - Reporting Live (2018) as Rifat Wasim
 Teri Meri Doriyaann (2022-till date) as Santosh Kaur Monga

Web series 
 The Aam Aadmi Family (season 1: 2016; Season 2: 2017; Season 3: 2019)
 The Gone Game (season 1: 2020; Season 2: 2022)
 Fittrat (season 2-present 2021)
 Sandwiched Forever –2020 (Sony LIV) as Manjari Sarnaik
Bhalla Calling Bhalla (2020) as Lovely Bhalla

References

Sources
 In everyone's eye 2006, 11 January. The Times of India
 Getting noticed, finally! 2006, 11 January. The Times of India
 Yashpal Sharma hopes to break mould with small screen debut 2010, 8 July. Sify News
 Baby's day out...with Baa and Bahoo 2005, 20 September. The Hindu

External links
 
 

Living people
21st-century Indian actresses
Actresses in Hindi cinema
Indian television actresses
Actresses from Mumbai
Mithibai College alumni
Indian stage actresses
Indian soap opera actresses
Year of birth missing (living people)